The Roller skating competition at the 2010 Central American and Caribbean Games was being held in Mayagüez, Puerto Rico. 

The tournament was scheduled to be held from 18–22 July in the country of Colombia.

Medal summary

Men's events

Women's events

External links

Events at the 2010 Central American and Caribbean Games
July 2010 sports events in North America
2010
2010 in roller sports